Shahrak-e Horr (also Romanized as Shahrak-e Ḩorr and Shahrak-e Ḩor) is a village in Julaki Rural District, Jayezan District, Omidiyeh County, Khuzestan Province, Iran. At the 2006 census, its population was 988, in 162 families.

References 

Populated places in Omidiyeh County